Kem Sokha (born 27 June 1953) is a Cambodian politician and activist who most recently served as the President of the Cambodia National Rescue Party (CNRP). He served as the Minority Leader, the highest-ranking opposition parliamentarian, of the National Assembly from December 2016 to January 2017, and previously as the First Vice President of the National Assembly from August 2014 to October 2015. He represented Kampong Cham as its Member of Parliament (MP) from 2008 to 2017. From 2007 to 2012, Kem was the leader of the Human Rights Party, which he founded.

Kem was arrested and imprisoned at a detention centre in Tbong Khmum Province on 3 September 2017 under allegations of treason. In November 2017, the CNRP was dissolved, and 118 of its members, including Kem, were banned from politics for five years. On 10 September 2018, more than a year after his arrest, he was released on bail, and subsequently placed under house arrest. On 10 November 2019, Kem was released from house arrest.

In March 2023, he was convicted and sentenced to 27 years of house arrest.

Education
Kem Sokha has stated to Voice of America in 2018 that he pursued a law degree at the Royal University of Law and Economics in Phnom Penh, but dropped out in his second year before receiving a scholarship to Czechoslovakia (now the Czech Republic) in 1981. He studied at the University of Chemistry and Technology, Prague, and graduated with a Master of Science degree in chemistry in 1986.

Political career
 
His political career began in 1993, when he was elected a representative for Takéo Province; at that time he was a member of Son Sann's Buddhist Liberal Democratic Party. In 1999, he joined the royalist FUNCINPEC and subsequently elected a senator. He resigned from his Senate seat in 2001. In 2002, he founded the Cambodian Center for Human Rights but left that organisation to join politics in 2005. He founded the Human Rights Party, which came third in the 2008 elections.

Kem Sokha is well known for his weekly town hall meetings at local level throughout the country. He was the first to introduce a free and open forum discussing issues concerning civic and political rights, as well as social and economic development, at village level in Cambodia. Kem Sokha is known for his non-violent, political tolerant policy standing on democratic and unity principles. His words are often quoted and repeated by ordinary Cambodians. His phrase "Do Min Do" (literal translation to English: "Change or no change") became the anthem for the Cambodia National Rescue Party's election Campaign in July 2013, which drew an unprecedented amount of youth participation.

On 26 August 2014, Kem was elected by the National Assembly as its First Vice President with 116 votes, the first opposition MP to hold the office. On 30 October 2015, he was ousted from the vice presidency by a vote of 68–0 following disagreements with the ruling party. On 9 September 2016, after months under house arrest, Kem was sentenced to five months in prison after refusing to appear in court for questioning in a prostitution case against him. He was later granted a royal pardon by King Norodom Sihamoni. Following his release, he was officially appointed as Minority Leader. However, the positions of Minority Leader and Majority Leader were abolished altogether by the National Assembly on 31 January 2017 following a proposal by Prime Minister Hun Sen.

On 2 March 2017, Kem was elected president of the Cambodia National Rescue Party at the party's congress, along with three other deputies. Under his leadership, the party made sweeping gains in the June 2017 local elections, winning 482 of 1,646 communes.

Treason allegations
In September 2017, the Phnom Penh Municipal Court charged Kem with "treason and espionage", and for allegedly orchestrating the 2014 Veng Sreng street protests. He was arrested at his home on September 3, 2017. Hun Sen and other Cambodian government officials alleged that Kem was conspiring with the United States of America. Kem's lawyers have alleged violations of their client's rights under Article 149 of the Criminal Procure Code. He was released on bail on 10 September 2018, more than a year after his arrest, but was placed under house arrest. He was released from house arrest on 10 November 2019 but is banned from travelling outside the country and taking part in political activities.

See also 
 Cambodian Center for Human Rights

References

External links 
 Kem Sokha 
 Kem Sokha on Facebook 
 Human Rights Party
 Cambodia National Rescue Party 
 CCHR – Cambodian Center for Human Rights website
 Newsweek article
 Cambodia arrests rights activist, Guy De Launey, BBC, Phnom Penh
 Working Group for an ASEAN Human Rights Mechanism
 Institute of Chemical Technology
 Cambodian Leader Cracks Down in Bid to Solidify Power—New York Times
 BBC: While in U.S., Cambodians Get a Lesson on Rights From Home
 Cambodian Center for Human Rights

|-

 
|- 
 

 
|-

|- 

 
|- 
 

 
|- 

 
|-

|-

1953 births
20th-century Cambodian politicians
21st-century Cambodian politicians
Amnesty International prisoners of conscience held by Cambodia
Buddhist Liberal Democratic Party politicians
Cambodia National Rescue Party politicians
Cambodian anti-communists
Cambodian democracy activists
Cambodian human rights activists
Cambodian nationalists
Cambodian prisoners and detainees
Cambodian Theravada Buddhists
FUNCINPEC politicians
Human Rights Party (Cambodia) politicians
Leaders of the Opposition (Cambodia)
Living people
Members of the National Assembly (Cambodia)
Members of the Senate (Cambodia)
People from Takéo province
Political party founders
Recipients of Cambodian royal pardons
Royal University of Law and Economics alumni
University of Chemistry and Technology, Prague alumni